Çukurova Regional Airport is a projected airport being built in the Tarsus district of Mersin Province, southern Turkey. It will serve the provinces of Mersin and Adana, as well as the rest of the region of Çukurova. It most likely will be continuing all and more destinations from its predecessor, Adana Şakirpaşa Airport, including its IATA code of 'ADA'. The project was said to begin operations in February 2023.

Çukurova region
Çukurova is a region in mid south Turkey which includes the historical Cilicia of the antiquity. The  Turkish provinces of Adana, Mersin, Osmaniye as well as a part of Hatay are in Çukurova. At the present all these provinces are served by Adana Şakirpaşa Airport in the urban fabric of Adana city. But the increasing air traffic necessitates a higher capacity airport.

Location 
The new airport will be constructed at the west of Karasavran village between Çiçekli and Kargılı in Tarsus district of Mersin Province. The airport is also close to another project, the Kazanlı Coast Tourism Project, within the scope of Tourism centers of Mersin Province.

The project
The construction contract was signed on 26 January 2012. According to a statement made by  Binali Yıldırım, Minister of Communications, Maritime affairs and Telecommunications, it is a build-operate-transfer project. The undertaker is a consortium of "Skyline" and "Zonguldak Özel Sivil Havacılık". The builders have the right to operate the airport for a term of nine years and ten months. The minister added that the airport will have international status and will so help to increase the export of the region and the number of tourists.

According to the newspaper Hürriyet, the project's cost will be 357 million Euro. When finished, it will serve to 15 million people, and the capacity will be doubled in the future.

In February 2022 the opening was announced for 29 October 2022, National holiday of the Republic. 
 Then on 31 October 2022, the opening was delayed until February 2023.  As of 9 March 2023, the airport is not yet open.

Groundbreaking
The groundbreaking ceremony was held on 28 May 2013. In the ceremony, then-Minister of Transport Binali Yıldırım explained that the location of the airport has been carefully chosen to serve both Adana and Mersin.

See also 
Adana Şakirpaşa Airport

References 

Buildings and structures in Mersin Province
Transport in Adana Province
Transport in Mersin Province
Proposed airports in Turkey
Transport infrastructure under construction in Turkey
Build–operate–transfer